The 2016 United States Senate election in Louisiana took place on November 8, 2016, to elect a member of the United States Senate to represent the State of Louisiana, concurrently with the 2016 U.S. presidential election, as well as other elections to the United States Senate in other states and elections to the United States House of Representatives and various state and local elections.

Under Louisiana's "jungle primary" system, all candidates appeared on the same ballot, regardless of party, and voters could vote for any candidate. Since no candidate received a majority of the vote during the primary election, a runoff election was held December 10 between the top two candidates in the primary, Republican John Neely Kennedy and Democrat Foster Campbell. Louisiana is the only state that has a jungle primary system (California and Washington have a similar "top two primary" system).

Incumbent Republican Senator David Vitter unsuccessfully ran for Governor of Louisiana in the 2015 election, losing to Democrat John Bel Edwards. In his concession speech, Vitter announced that he would not seek re-election.

In addition to Kennedy and Campbell, four other candidates — Republicans Charles Boustany, John Fleming, and David Duke, and Democrat Caroline Fayard — qualified to participate at a debate at Dillard University, a historically black college, on November 2, 2016.

On November 8, Kennedy and Campbell finished in first and second respectively and thus advanced to the runoff, which was held December 10. In the runoff, Kennedy won the election with over 60% of the vote.

Candidates

Republican Party

Declared 
 Charles Boustany, U.S. Representative
 Donald "Crawdaddy" Crawford, business appraiser
 Joseph Cao, former U.S. Representative and candidate for Louisiana Attorney General in 2011
 David Duke, former State Representative, former Grand Wizard of the Ku Klux Klan and perennial candidate
 John Fleming, U.S. Representative
 John Neely Kennedy, state treasurer, Democratic candidate for the U.S. Senate in 2004 and nominee for the U.S. Senate Class 2 in 2008
 Rob Maness, retired United States Air Force Colonel, and candidate for the U.S. Senate in 2014
 Charles Eugene Marsala, financial advisor and former mayor of Atherton, California

Withdrew 
 Abhay Patel, businessman

Declined 
 Scott Angelle, Public Service Commissioner, former Lieutenant Governor of Louisiana, and candidate for governor in 2015 (running for LA-03)
 Jay Dardenne, Louisiana Commissioner of Administration, former Lieutenant Governor of Louisiana and candidate for governor in 2015
 Melinda Schwegmann, former lieutenant governor of Louisiana, former state representative, and candidate for governor in 1995
 Zach Dasher, pharmaceutical representative, cousin of the Robertson family and candidate for LA-05 in 2014
 Brett Geymann, former state representative (running for LA-03)
 Clay Higgins, former St. Landry Parish Sheriff's captain (running for LA-03)
 Paul Hollis, state representative and candidate for the U.S. Senate in 2014
 Bobby Jindal, former Governor of Louisiana
 Vance McAllister, former U.S. representative and candidate for the state senate in 2015
 Tony Perkins, president of the Family Research Council, former state representative and candidate for the U.S. Senate in 2002
 Eric Skrmetta, Public Service Commissioner
 David Vitter, incumbent U.S. Senator and nominee for governor in 2015
 John Young, former president of Jefferson Parish and candidate for lieutenant governor in 2015

Democratic Party

Declared 
 Foster Campbell, Public Service Commissioner, former State Senator, candidate for governor in 2007 and for LA-04 in 1980, 1988 and 1990
 Derrick Edwards, attorney and disability rights activist
 Caroline Fayard, attorney and candidate for lieutenant governor in 2010
 Gary Landrieu, building contractor, candidate for the New Orleans City Council in 2012, candidate for LA-02 in 2012 and 2014 and cousin of former U.S. Senator Mary Landrieu and New Orleans Mayor Mitch Landrieu
 Vinny Mendoza, USAF Ret. Veteran, organic farmer and 1st CD candidate in 2004, 2008, 2010, 2012 and 2014,
 Josh Pellerin, businessman
 Peter Williams, tree farmer, candidate for LA-06 in 2014 and Independent candidate for LA-05 in 2013

Declined 
 Jim Bernhard, president of Bernhard Capital Partners, founder and former CEO of The Shaw Group and former chairman of the Louisiana Democratic Party
 Don Cazayoux, former U.S. Representative and former United States Attorney for the Middle District of Louisiana
 John Georges, businessman, candidate for governor in 2007 and candidate for Mayor of New Orleans in 2010
 Kip Holden, Mayor-President of East Baton Rouge Parish and candidate for lieutenant governor in 2015 (running for LA-02)
 Robert Johnson, state representative and candidate for LA-05 in 2013
 Eric LaFleur, state senator
 Mary Landrieu, former U.S. Senator
 Mitch Landrieu, Mayor of New Orleans and former Lieutenant Governor of Louisiana
 Charlie Melancon, former U.S. Representative and nominee in 2010
 Jacques Roy, Mayor of Alexandria
 Gary Smith, Jr., state senator

Libertarian Party

Declared 
 Thomas Clements, Republican candidate for the U.S. Senate in 2014 (also ran for President of the United States)
 Le Roy Gillam, minister

Independents

Declared 
 Beryl Billiot, restaurateur and candidate for governor in 2015
 Troy Hebert, former commissioner of the Louisiana Office of Alcohol and Tobacco Control and former state senator
 Bob Lang, candidate for the U.S. Senate in 2010 and candidate for governor in 2011
 Kaitlin Marone, stand-up comedian
 Gregory Taylor, unemployed janitor
 Arden Wells, perennial candidate

Jungle primary

Debates

Endorsements

Polling

Results

Maps

Runoff

Polling

Predictions

Results

References 
Additional candidates

External links 
 John Kennedy (R) for Senate
 Foster Campbell (D) for Senate

2016
Louisiana
United States Senate